Video gaming in the United States is one of the fastest-growing entertainment industries in the country. According to a 2020 study released by the Entertainment Software Association, The yearly economic output of the American video game industry in 2019 was $90.3 billion. Supporting over 429,000 American jobs. With an average yearly salary of about $121,000, the latter figure includes over 143,000 individuals who are directly employed by the video game business. Additionally, activities connected to the video game business generate $12.6 billion in federal, state, and local taxes each year. World Economic Forum estimates that by 2025 the American gaming industry will reach $42.3 billion while worldwide gaming industry will possibly reach US$270 billion.

In statistics collected by The ESA for the year 2013, a reported 58% of Americans play video games and the average American household now owns at least one dedicated game console, PC or smartphone. The households that own these items play games most commonly on their Console or PC. 36% of U.S. gamers play on their smart phones.  43% of video game consumers believe games give them the most value for their money compared to other common forms of entertainment such as movies, or music. In 2011, the average American gamer spent an average of 13 hours per week playing video games. In 2013, almost half of Americans who were gaming more than they did in 2010 spent less time playing board games, watching TV, going to the movies, and watching movies at home. When Americans game, 62% do so with others online or in person, yet the other person is more likely to be a friend than a significant other or family member.  The most common reason parents play video games with their children is as a fun family activity, or because they are asked to. 52% of parents believe video games are a positive part of their child's life, and 71% of parents with children under 18 see gaming as beneficial to mental stimulation or education.

Demographics
The average age of a U.S. gamer is 35, the average number of years a U.S. gamer has been playing games is 13. In 2021, it was reported that the age distribution of U.S. gamers were 20% under the 18 years old, 38% were in between 18 and 34 years old, 14% were in between 35 and 44 years old, 12% were in between 45 and 54 years old, 9% were in between 55 and 64 years old, and 7% were 65 years old or over. The American gamer population is 54% male and 46% female. Of those females, women 18 and older account for a greater portion of the population than males younger than 18. The average female video game player is 14 years old, while the average male video game player is 13.

Market statistics
The best-selling console video game genres of 2012 were action, shooters, and sports. The PC gaming market's best-selling genres were role-playing, strategy, and casual. For online games, the most popular genres are puzzle/trivia, action/strategy, and casual/social games.
While there are many American video game developers that have been producing games for years, Japanese video games and companies have regularly been listed in the annual lists of best sellers.
The U.S. computer and video game dollar sales growth of 2012 was 14.8 billion dollars, showing a drop of 1.6 billion from the year before. The Unit sales growth featured a similar drop with the report of 188 million units sold from 245.9 in 2011. U.S gaming consumers spent a total of $20.77 billion on the game industry alone and currently hard copies of video games are still dominating in sales compared to digital copies .

Best-selling video games
The following titles are the top ten best-selling video games in the United States, according to sales figures from The NPD Group. The list covers console games and PC games, but does not include console pack-in game bundles, arcade video games, mobile games, or free-to-play titles. Among the top ten titles, six were developed or published by Japanese company Nintendo, two published by American company Activision, and two from British developer Rockstar North and American publisher Rockstar Games.

History

1940s

The beginning of video games can be traced to the year 1940, when American nuclear physicist Edward Condon designed a computer capable of playing the traditional game Nim. This device would have tens of thousands of people play it even though the computer won 90% of the time. Seven years later an American television pioneer, Thomas T. Goldsmith, Jr., patented an oscilloscope displayed device that challenged players to fire a gun at a target.

1950s
At the start of the 1950s another American, Claude Shannon, wrote basic guidelines on programming a computer. Although OXO was created in England by the year 1952, the findings and inventions of the Americans described helped make it possible. The U.S. military dove into the computer age with the creation of a game titled Hutspiel. Considered a war game, Hutspiel depicted NATO and Soviet commanders waging war. The IBM 701 computer received programs like Blackjack and Checkers. A later IBM model featured a chess program that was capable of evaluating four ply ahead. The '50s also included the largely forgotten tennis game created by Willy Higinbotham that anticipated the famous game Pong.

1960s
The military continued to take part in video gaming in the 1960s when, shortly after the Cuban Missile Crisis The Defense Department created a war game known as STAGE (Simulation of Total Atomic Global Exchange). STAGE was created to be political propaganda that showcased how the U.S. would be victorious in a Thermonuclear war with the Soviet Union. The idea of video games that were usable on televisions was conceived by the engineer
Ralph Baer and with the help of a team, Baer completed two successful TV games in this decade. The first interactive media computer game, Spacewar eventually had the future founders of Atari create an arcade game of it titled Computer Space that became the first video arcade game ever released.

1970s

The 1970s included the birth of the video game console. The first console released was titled Magnavox Odyssey and the foundation of Atari occurred around the same time, marking the start of Pong's development. Upon Pong's completion it became the hottest selling Christmas product of 1975. The evolution of the console was incredibly rapid. A few years after their invention, consoles received microprocessors and programmable ROM cartridge based games, allowing users the ability to change games by simply switching cartridges. Important consoles released at this time were the Telstar, Fairchild Channel F., and Atari 2600. Arcade games also received advances with the game Space Invaders, which allowed high scores to be tracked and displayed. A year later the game Asteroids built on the idea and gave high scorers the ability to enter initials by their scores.

1980s

The technological advances of the late '70s led to the introduction of the Intellivision in 1980, which featured better video game graphics but a higher price tag. In two years, the Commodore 64 changed the market by not only being the most powerful console of the time but also the cheapest. With the lowered prices, popularity of the video game industry continued to grow and the first video game magazine, Electronic Games, was printed. However, attempts to copycat on the success of the Atari 2600 saturated the market, and the video game crash of 1983 decimated the industry in the United States. With the American-produced games on the downswing, Nintendo successfully launched the Nintendo Entertainment System in America in 1985, revitalizing the market with the introduction of the third and fourth generation of home consoles such as the Master System, Game Boy, Sega Genesis, Atari 7800, and the TurboGrafx-16, with systems transitioning to support 3D graphics and support for optical media rather than cartridges.

1990s

The early '90s saw the introduction of the Super NES, PlayStation, Nintendo 64, Tamagotchi, and Dreamcast, whose sales brought the damaged video game industry back to life. During this decade, the PlayStation was considered the most popular console when its 20 millionth unit sold. In 1993, the video game industries' first debate began and its focus was on violence found in video games. This debate fueled Senator Joseph Lieberman's desire to ban all violent games and from this investigation the  Entertainment Software Rating Board was created in 1994; giving all games a printed suggested age rating on their packaging.

2000s

The 2000s brought Sony even more popularity when its PlayStation 2 had such a high American consumer demand that it actually affected the console's availability to be purchased during the first few shipments; the PlayStation 2 remains the best-selling console of all time in the United States. Microsoft and Nintendo also saw this popularity with the release of their own sixth and seventh generation of consoles, the Xbox and GameCube, respectively. Mass availability of the Internet introduced online connectivity on consoles for multiplayer games as well as digital storefronts to sell games. Digital storefronts also enabled the growth of the indie game market, expanding from computers onto consoles over this decade. Motion control-enabled games, popularized by the Wii console, grew in popularity. According to estimates from Nielsen Media Research, approximately 45.7 million U.S. households in 2006 (or approximately 40 percent of approximately 114.4 million) owned a dedicated home video game console.

2010s

Within the 2010s, a larger shift towards casual and mobile gaming on smartphones and tablets became significant, in part due to a wider demographic of video game players drawing in more female and older players. The concept of Games as a service, emerged as a trend for developers and publishers to have long-tail monetization of a game well after release. Continuing from the previous decade, a large number of independently developed video games emerged as games on par with those from major publishers, made easier to promote and distribute through digital storefronts on personal computers, consoles, and mobile store markets. All three major console manufacturers released next generation consoles: Xbox One, PlayStation 4, Wii U, and Nintendo Switch. Major developments in mixed reality games - both augmented reality and virtual reality - grew in popularity during the 2010s as the cost of required hardware dropped. Esports became a significant market in the United States after its initial popularity in Eastern Asia countries. In 2015, 51 percent of U.S. households owned a dedicated home video game console according to an Entertainment Software Association annual industry report.

2020s

Microsoft and Sony have released their successors to their eighth generation consoles in November 2020, the  Xbox Series X/S and PlayStation 5. Both systems support high-definition graphics, real-time ray-tracing, game streaming and cloud-based gaming. Nintendo has continued with their Nintendo Switch at the beginning of this decade.

With the COVID-19 pandemic and lockdown causing people to stay in their homes, people picked up video games which caused a big boom in sales throughout 2019 all the way into 2021. The NPD Group reported that video game sales in North America in March 2020 were up 34% from those in March 2019, video game hardware up by 63%. Game companies also saw this as an opportunity to expand what they could do to entertain, so Epic Games hosted the first and second ever live in-game concert through Fortnite, first with Marshmello and second with “an in-game Travis Scott concert saw over 12 million concurrent views from players”.

Impact on the global gaming industry 
With RPG video game series like Dungeons & Dragons, The Elder Scrolls, and Fallout, and first-person shooters series like Doom, Half-Life, and BioShock, the American video game industry has heavily influenced the global gaming industry. Some of the best-selling and most popular video games ever made like Call of Duty, Fortnite, World of Warcraft, Overwatch, League of Legends, Valorant, CSGO, Dota 2, Apex Legends and Roblox were made in the United States. Some of the most revolutionary video games like Skyrim, Half-Life, BioShock, were also made in America.

Alongside video games, American companies like Epic Games have also contributed to the video game industry with high-technology. Unreal Engine and Unity are considered to be one of the best and most popular video game engines of all time. With the rise of Steam in the mid-2010s and easy access to video game making tools and engines, it sparked the rise of Indie games

Criticisms 
While the rise of American multiplayer games has grown the global video game industry, many video game journalists and gamers have heavily criticized some of the decisions and changes made by American companies, such as the addition of micro-transactions in video games. After the release and huge success of The Legend of Zelda: Breath of the Wild in 2017 and Elden Ring in 2022, complaints started pouring in that the American gaming industry was lacking far behind and not investing enough in innovation like Japanese gaming companies.

Video game publishers 
Some of the largest video game companies in the world are based in the United States. There are 444 publishers, developers, and hardware companies in California alone.

Sony Interactive Entertainment (PlayStation} 

Sony Interactive Entertainment is gaming subsidiary and video game publishing arm of Japanese multinational conglomerate Sony Group Corporation. In 2016 Sony Group moved Sony Interactive Entertainment's headquarters to California. With over 4,000 developers and 19 studios, Sony Interactive Entertainment is one of the biggest video game companies in the word. 10 out of 19 studios are American studios. In 2022, Sony Interactive Entertainment made a major investment in America and acquired Bungie for $3.7 billion. Sony Interactive Entertainment owns popular American video game studios like Naughty Dog, Santa Monica Studio, Insomniac Games, Sucker Punch and franchises like God of War, The Last of Us, and Uncharted. God of War Ragnarok has sold over 5.1 million units in 1 week and 11 million units in 2 months, making it the fastest selling first-party Game in PlayStation history.

Take-Two Interactive 

In September 1993, Ryan Brant established the American video game holding firm Take-Two Interactive Software, Inc. in New York City. Rockstar Games and 2K, two significant publishing labels owned by Take-Two Interactive, both have internal game production teams. Take-Two established the Private Division label to assist independent developer publication, and more recently revealed Intercept Games as a new inside company for the label. The business also established Ghost Story Games, rebranding Irrational Games, a former 2K firm. To establish itself in the market for mobile games, the company bought Socialpoint, Playdots, and Nordeus. Additionally, the business controls 50% of the professional esports league NBA 2K League. Take-Two's combined portfolio includes franchises such as BioShock, Borderlands, Grand Theft Auto, NBA 2K, and Red Dead among others. In 2022, Take-Two Interactive acquired mobile video game company Zynga for $12.7 billion.

Activision Blizzard 

Activision Blizzard is world's largest independent first-party publisher. Activision Blizzard is also the largest video game company in the Americas and Europe in terms of revenue and market capitalization. It was founded in July 2008 through the merger of two video game publishers, Activision and Blizzard Entertainment. Activision Blizzard is the company that makes and owns some of the most popular video games in the industry, including Call of Duty, Overwatch, World of Warcraft, Crash Bandicoot, Hearthstone, Candy Crush, and Diablo. Microsoft announced its intent to acquire Activision Blizzard for $68.7 billion on January 18, 2022. If approved, Activision Blizzard would become a division of Xbox Game Studios. Call of Duty: Modern Warfare II became the fastest selling and most profitable Call of Duty game of all time, grossing over $1 billion in just 10 days.

Electronic Arts (EA) 

American video game developer Electronic Arts (EA) is based in Redwood City, California. Trip Hawkins, an Apple employee, founded the business in May 1982. It was a pioneer in the early home computer gaming market and referred to the designers and programmers behind its games as "software artists." With 12,900 video game developers, Electronic Arts is one of the biggest video game publishers in the world. Respawn Entertainment, BioWare, Dice, PopCap, are some of the studies under Electronic Arts. With the success of EA Sports and game series such as FIFA, NHL, NBA Live and Madden NFL, Dragon Age, Mass Effect, Dead Space, Star Wars Jedi Electronic Arts become one the biggest video game companies in the world.

Xbox Game Studios (Xbox) 

Xbox Game Studios is gaming subsidiary and video game publishing arm of American software company Microsoft. In 2001 Xbox Game Studios released its first Xbox console. The most successful console released by Xbox was the Xbox 360, which sold over 84 million units in 2005.  In 2014, Xbox acquired Mojang, the developers of Minecraft, the best-selling video game of all time for $2.5 billion. In 2021, Xbox acquired Bethesda Softworks, video game publisher and owner of major video game franchises like The Elder Scrolls, Fallout, and Doom, for $7.5 billion.  In 2022, Xbox announced that it would be acquiring American video game giant  Activision Blizzard for $68.7 billion in an all-cash deal. Xbox owns 23 studios worldwide and some of the most popular video game studios like Bethesda Game Studios, Id Software, Playground Games, Ninja Theory, Rare, and Arkane Studios.

Bethesda Softworks 

A video game publisher situated in Rockville, Maryland, is called Bethesda Softworks. In 1986, Christopher Weaver established the business. Only the publishing role of Bethesda Softworks remained after the company broke off its internal development team into Bethesda Game Studios. ZeniMax was acquired by Microsoft in 2021, and Microsoft insisted that ZeniMax would continue to run as a distinct firm. Bethesda Softworks has published some of the most popular and best-selling games, including The Elder Scrolls V: Skyrim, Fallout 4 and Doom Eternal. In November 2016, Bethesda announced that Skyrim had sold over 30 million copies, making it one of the top 20 best-selling games of all time.

Epic Games 

Epic Games is an American video game and software developer and publisher. Epic Games develops Unreal Engine, a commercially available game engine which also powers their internally developed video games. In 2014, Unreal Engine was named the "most successful video game engine" by Guinness World Records.  More than 7.5 million developers are using Unreal Engine according to Epic CEO Tim Sweeney Epic Games owns video game developers like Psyonix, Mediatonic and Harmonix and popular video games like Fortnite, Rocket League and Fall Guys.

Valve 

The American firm Valve Corporation creates, publishes, and distributes digital video games. It is the company behind Half-Life, Counter-Strike, Portal, Team Fortress, Left 4 Dead, and Dota, as well as the software distribution platform Steam. Steam is the largest digital distribution platform for PC gaming worldwide. There are over 30,000 titles on Steam, everything from AAA to indie.  In 2022, For the first time ever, Steam broke a worldwide record with more than 30 million people actively using Steam at the same time. Valve released the Steam Deck, a handheld console, in 2022. Steam Deck has sold over 1 million units.

Warner Bros Games 

Warner Bros. Interactive Entertainment is part of the newly-formed global streaming and interactive entertainment unit of Warner Bros. Discovery. Warner Bros Games owns video game development studios like TT Games, Rocksteady Studios, NetherRealm Studios, Monolith Productions, Avalanche Software, and WB Games Montréal, among others. Warner Bros Games is also the publisher of Batman Arkham and Mortal Kombat video game series. Hogwarts Legacy became the best-selling and most profitable video game in Warner Bros. Games history, selling over 12 million units in 2 weeks and grossing over $850 million.

Riot Games 

Based in Los Angeles, California, Riot Games, is an American company that creates video games and organizes esports competitions. In addition to developing various spin-off games and the unrelated popular first-person shooter game Valorant, it was created in September 2006 by Brandon Beck and Marc Merrill with the intention of creating League of Legends. Riot Games was purchased by Tencent, a Chinese corporation, in 2011. Riot Games is one of the fastest growing American video game companies with over 5,500 developers.The company had 24 offices worldwide as of 2018. League of Legends produced $1.75 billion in revenue in 2020 alone.

Employment

Education training
Video game designers are required to have a variety of skills and innate abilities that feature a vast amount of training in computer graphics, animation and software design. On top of these skills a successful designer needs a powerful imagination and knowledge of the various consoles' operating systems. Programming and hardware essentials are a must, considering games are sophisticated computer software. To get into the field many colleges offer classes, certificates, and degrees in computer programming, computer engineering, software development, computer animation, and computer graphics. Internships or apprenticeships are important to get hands on experience. If possible an aspiring American game designer should conduct freelance work.  There is even the possibility of designing a game independently, using a wide array of available software. Building an independent game can be risky yet the finished product gives employers insight on what the designer is capable of; just like a portfolio.

Job market
The U.S. video game industry continues to function as a vital source of employment. Currently, video game companies directly and indirectly employ more than 120,000 people in 34 states. The average compensation for direct employees is $90,000, resulting in total national compensation of $2.9 billion.

The current job market for game design in the US is extremely competitive, however it is soon expected to have a 32% increase in software publishing jobs, according to the U.S. Department of Labor. An American game designer's salary depends on where the designer works, who they work for, and what kind of designer they are. A good starting place on finding average salaries is  International Game Developers Association's entry level salary report that lists $50,000 to $80,000 annually; averaging $57.600.  A closer comparison to what a US Game developing job could potentially start at is the Learn Direct's report of $37,000 yearly.

Game ratings and government oversight

Prior to 1993, there was no standardized content rating body in the United States, but with games becoming more violent and with capabilities to show more realistic graphics, parents, politicians, and other concerned citizens called for government regulation of the industry. The 1993 congressional hearings on video games, putting the recently released Mortal Kombat and Night Trap in the spotlight, drew attention to the industry's lack of a standardized rating system. While individual publishers like Sega and Nintendo had their own methods of rating games, they were not standardized and allowed discrepancies between different console systems including sales of violent games to minors. Members of Congress threatened to pass legislation that would mandate government oversight of video games if the industry did not create its own solution. The industry responded in 1994 by the formation of the trade group the Interactive Digital Software Association (IDSA), today known as the Entertainment Software Association (ESA), and the creation of the voluntary Entertainment Software Ratings Board (ESRB) ratings system, a system that met the governmental concerns of the time. The ESRB focused mostly on console games at its founding. Computer video game software used the Recreational Software Advisory Council (RSAC) through 1999, but transitioned to use ESRB in 1999 while the RSAC became more focused on rating online content from the Internet.

Since 1993, several incidents of gun violence in the United States, such as the Columbine School shooting of 1999, put more blame on video games for inciting these crimes, thought there is no conclusive proof that violent video games lead to violent behavior. Under demands of parents and concerned citizens, federal and state governments have attempted to pass legislation that would enforce the ESRB rating systems for retail that would pose fines to retailers that sold mature-rated games to minors. This came to a head in the Supreme Court of the United States case Brown v. Entertainment Merchants Association, which concluded in 2010 that video games were considered a form of protected speech, and regulation of their sales could only be mandated if the material passed the Miller test for obscene material.

The ESRB remains a voluntary system for rating video games in the United States, though nearly all major retail outlets will refuse to sell unrated games and will typically avoid selling those listed as "AO" for adults only. Retailers are voluntarily bound by the age ratings, though the Federal Trade Commission, in 2013, found that the ESRB system had the best compliance of preventing sales of mature games to minors compared to the other American entertainment industries. In addition to age ratings, the ESRB rating includes content descriptors (such as "Nudity", "Use of Drugs", and "Blood and Gore") to better describe the type of questionable material that may be in the game. The ESRB not only rates games after reviewing material submitted by the publisher, but also spot-checks games after release to make sure no additional content had been added after review, applying fines and penalties to publishers that do so. Notably, the ESRB was heavily involved over the Hot Coffee mod, a user mod of Grand Theft Auto: San Andreas that unlocked a sex scene that had been on the retail disc but otherwise inaccessible without the mod. Currently 85% of American parents are aware of the ESRB rating system and many are finding parental controls on video game consoles useful.

In the digital storefront space, including digital-only games and downloadable content for retail games, the ESRB does not require ratings though encourages developers and publishers to utilize the self-assessment ratings tools provided by the International Age Rating Coalition to assign their game a rating which can propagate to other national and regional ratings systems, such as the Pan European Game Information (PEGI) system.

Arcade games in the United States are rated separated under a "Parental Advisory System" devised by the American Amusement Machine Association, the Amusement & Music Operators Association, and the International Association for the Leisure and Entertainment Industry, along with guidelines for where more mature games should be located in arcades and other code of conduct principles for arcade operators.

See also

 History of video games

Notes

References

 
American culture